Love at First Sight is a 1929 American musical comedy film directed by Edgar Lewis and starring Norman Foster, Suzanne Keener and Doris Rankin.

Cast
 Norman Foster as Richard Norton  
 Suzanne Keener as June Vernon  
 Doris Rankin as Mrs. Vernon  
 Lester Cole as Paul Russell  
 Abe Reynolds as Abe Feinstein  
 Hooper Atchley as Frank Belmont  
 Bert Matthews as Master of Ceremonies  
 Dorothee Adam as 'Jig-a-boo' singer  
 Jim Harkins

See also
 Love at first sight

References

Bibliography
 Michael R. Pitts. Poverty Row Studios, 1929-1940: An Illustrated History of 55 Independent Film Companies, with a Filmography for Each. McFarland & Company, 2005.

External links

1929 films
1929 musical comedy films
American musical comedy films
Films directed by Edgar Lewis
1920s English-language films
Chesterfield Pictures films
American comedy mystery films
1920s comedy mystery films
1920s American films